Rumi Wayin Punta (quechua rumi stone, Ancash Quechua wayi house, -n a  suffix, punta peak; ridge, "stone house peak (or ridge)", also spelled Rumihuainpunta) is a mountain in the Andes of Peru which reaches a height of approximately . It is located in the Ancash Region, Bolognesi Province, Chiquian District, southwest of Chiquian.

References

Mountains of Peru
Mountains of Ancash Region